Johanne Seizberg (1732–1772) was a Danish artist, drawing artist, and illustrator, and a teacher.

Probably born in Augsburg in Germany, She was daughter of the printer Riedlinger and married Lieutenant Simon Philippinus Nerius Seizberg.

From 1754, she was a student of the artist couple Frants Michael Regenfuss and Margaretha Ludwig. She illustrated the Auserlesne Schnecken, Musscheln und andere Schaalthiere (1758), and the Flora Danica (1761). In 1762, she became a teacher in the art school for female students protected by the Royal Danish Academy of Fine Arts. In 1772, the school was closed after the fall of Johann Friedrich Struensee.

References 
  Dansk Kvindebiografisk Leksikon

1732 births
1772 deaths
Danish artists
18th-century Danish educators
18th-century Danish women educators